The 1934 LEN European Aquatics Championships were held 12–19 August 1934 in Magdeburg, Germany.

Medal table

Medal summary

Diving
Men's events

Women's events

Swimming
Men's events

Women's events

Water polo

See also
List of European Championships records in swimming

References

European Championships
European Aquatics Championships
LEN European Aquatics Championships
International aquatics competitions hosted by Germany
Sport in Magdeburg
European Aquatics Championships
1930s in Prussia